The following is a full list of awards and decorations of Leonid Brezhnev, Soviet General Secretary and statesman, sorted into two sections; foreign and domestic.

Domestic

Brezhnev's receipt of the Order of Victory was controversial; the award was restricted to commanding officers of high rank who successfully changed the course of the war in favor of the Red Army during World War II.  Brezhnev was a young political officer during the war who did reach the rank of lieutenant general, but did not command responsibility close to the other recipients of the Order.  He only received the decoration after he was Premier and thus able to essentially award the medal to himself.  As a result of the controversy, the Order of Victory was revoked in 1989.

Foreign

References 

Brezhnev, Leonid
Leonid Brezhnev